"Soon I Will Be Done (With the Troubles of the World)" is a traditional African-American spiritual.

Recordings
An notable arrangement was created by Edward Boatner (1898–1981). 

The song has been recorded by: 
Carla Bley and Steve Swallow. It appears on their 1988 album, Duets.
the David Crowder Band. It appears on their 2005 album, A Collision or (3+4=7).

Rising Appalachia based their 2012 song "Occupy" on "Soon I Will Be Done." It first appeared on their 2012 album, Filthy Dirty South. A live version appears on their 2017 album, Alive.

References

Citations

Works cited
 

African-American spiritual songs
Folk songs